Eldar Shakhbazovych Kuliyev (born 24 March 2002) is a Ukrainian professional football midfielder of Azerbaijani origin who plays for Mynai in the Ukrainian Premier League.

Career
Kuliyev is a product of the different Ukrainian sportive school systems.

He made his debut for Mariupol in the Ukrainian Premier League as a substituted player in the drawing away match against Inhulets Petrove on 25 October 2020.

On 11 February 2023, Azerbaijan Premier League club Zira announced the signing of Kuliyev to a three-and-a-half year contract, from Mynai.

References

External links
 
 

2002 births
Living people
Footballers from Kyiv
Ukrainian footballers
Association football midfielders
Ukrainian people of Azerbaijani descent
FC Mariupol players
FC Mynai players
Ukrainian Premier League players
Ukraine under-21 international footballers